IRA ceasefire may refer to:

 In the Irish War of Independence, the truce of 11 July 1921
 In the Irish Civil War, the "Irregulars" (anti-Treaty IRA) ceasefire of 30 April 1923
 In the Border Campaign (Irish Republican Army), the cessation described in the IRA press release of 26 February 1962
 In the Northern Ireland Troubles:
 Official Irish Republican Army, ceasefire of 30 May 1972
 Chronology of Provisional Irish Republican Army actions (1970–79), ceasefires of 1972 and 1975 (and other shorter intervals)
 Chronology of Provisional Irish Republican Army actions (1990–99), ceasefire of 1994–6, and the final ceasefire of 19 July 1997